Auraria 9th Street Historic District is a historic district in Denver, Colorado at Auraria Campus.  It includes both sides of one block of 9th Street, from Curtis St. to Champa St.  The listing included 33 contributing buildings.  The district was listed on the National Register of Historic Places in 1973.

The block was developed with mainly Victorian-style, modest homes during 1873 to 1905.

The street has been removed and replaced with a greenway.

See also 

 Metropolitan State University of Denver
 Auraria Campus

References

External links

Victorian architecture in Colorado
Auraria Campus
Historic districts on the National Register of Historic Places in Colorado
Streets in Colorado
National Register of Historic Places in Denver
Transportation in Denver
Greenways
Houses on the National Register of Historic Places in Colorado
Houses in Denver